Eremiaphila zetterstedti, common name desert pebble mantis, is a species of praying mantis found in Africa.

See also
List of mantis genera and species

References

Eremiaphila
Mantodea of Africa
Insects described in 1942